Abderrahim Essaidi (born 2 June 1983 in Casablanca) is a Moroccan footballer, Saidi is currently attached to KAC Marrakech.

External links
 Wydad Profile

1983 births
Living people
Footballers from Casablanca
Association football midfielders
Moroccan footballers
Wydad AC players
Moghreb Tétouan players
Kawkab Marrakech players
RS Berkane players